Cowboy Rim is a cliff that runs along the Continental Divide in the Animas Mountains of Hidalgo County, New Mexico. Here Cowboy Rim overlooks the Gillespie Creek valley below it to the north, and the Continental Divide runs along this section of the rim, then turns of to the south-southwest from the highpoint, along a ridge west of Elephant Butte Canyon. This section of the Rim overlooks the Playas Valley below it to the east.

References

Cliffs of New Mexico
Landforms of Hidalgo County, New Mexico